Kalyanji–Anandji are an Indian composer duo: Kalyanji Virji Shah (30 June 1928 – 24 August 2000) and his brother Anandji Virji Shah (born 2 March 1933). The duo are known for their work on Hindi film soundtracks, with many evergreen songs being composed by them.

Some of their best-known works are Don, Bairaag, Saraswatichandra, Qurbani, Muqaddar Ka Sikandar, Laawaris (film), Tridev, Safar, etc. They won the 1975 Filmfare Award for Best Music Director for Kora Kagaz.

Career
Kalyanji and Anandji were children of a Kutchi businessman who migrated from Kundrodi village in Kutch to 'Bombay' (now Mumbai) to start a grocery and provision store. Their younger brother and his wife are the husband and wife duo Babla & Kanchan. The brothers began to learn music from a music teacher, who taught them in lieu of paying his bills to their father. One of their great-grandparents was a folk musician of some eminence. They spent most of their formative years in the Mumbai locality of Girgaum amidst Marathi and Gujarati environs and among some eminent musical talent that resided in the vicinity.

Kalyanji started his career as a musician, with a new electronic instrument called the clavioline. which was used for the famous "Nagin Been," used in the film Nagin (1954) which had the music of Hemant Kumar. Kalyanji then, with his brother Anandji, started an orchestral group called Kalyanji Virji and Party which organised musical shows in Mumbai and outside. This was the first attempt made for holding live musical shows in India.

Kalyanji Anandji's arrival in the Bombay film industry as music composers was a turning point. When big music directors like S. D. Burman, Hemant Kumar, Madan Mohan, Naushad, Shankar–Jaikishan and O. P. Nayyar were ruling the Hindi film music world and it was a golden period of film music, it was very tough to make a place amongst them. They still managed to attain success amongst the competition.

The Bharat Bhushan– Nirupa Roy hit Samrat Chandragupta (1959) was his first film as Kalyanji Virji Shah. Songs like "Chahe Paas Ho" (Lata–Rafi) that are remembered to this day were what made the movie a commercial success. This was followed by his composing music scores for more films like Post Box 999 before Anandji who was assisting him, joined him officially to form the Kalyanji Anandji duo in Satta Bazaar and Madari (1959). Chhalia (1960) was their earliest major hit. In 1965, two decisive scores, Himalay Ki God Mein and Jab Jab Phool Khile, established them as composers to reckon with.

Both Kalyanji and Anandji worked as music composers for over 250 films, 17 of which were golden jubilees and 39 silver. They organised many charitable concerts for NGOs and several charitable institutions in India and abroad with some of the biggest names in Bollywood, like Dilip Kumar, Amitabh Bachchan, Anil Kapoor, Vinod Khanna, Rekha and Sridevi.

Manhar Udhas, Kumar Sanu, Anuradha Paudwal, Alka Yagnik, Sadhana Sargam, Sapna Mukherjee, Udit Narayan, Sunidhi Chauhan, now very popular names, were nurtured as singers and got their first breaks from Kalyanji Anandji. Laxmikant Pyarelal worked as music assistants to Kalyanji Anandji before composing Music independently for Hindi films. They helped introduce or gave career defining breaks to lyricists like Qamar Jalalabadi, Anand Bakshi, Gulshan Bawra, Anjaan, Verma Malik and M G Hashmat.

In the late 1990s and early 2000s, their work was introduced to a young Western audience by three albums. Bombay the Hard Way: Guns, Cars and Sitars was a mix album put together by US DJ Dan The Automator; Bollywood Funk was an Outcaste compilation album put together by Sutrasonic DJs Harv and Sunni; while The Beginners Guide To Bollywood was compiled by John Lewis from Time Out magazine. All three of these records concentrated on Kalyanji Anandji tracks from 1970s films that featured funk breakbeats, wah-wah guitars and Motown-style orchestrations. In 2005, The Black Eyed Peas's "Don't Phunk with My Heart" used music pieces from two of their songs: "Ae Naujawan" from the 1972 film Apradh and "Yeh Mera Dil" from the 1978 film Don, which won the American hip-hop group a Grammy Award.

On 24 August 2000, Kalyanji breathed his last.

The composers composed some popular songs rendered by Kishore Kumar such as "Jeevan se bhari teri aankhe", "Zindagi ka safar hai ye kaisa Safar", "Pal Pal dilke paas", "Neele Neele Ambar Par". Their composition called "Pal bharke liye" was used in an episode of The Simpsons. Remixed version of the song "Apni Toh Jaise Taise," originally from the 1981 film Laawaris was used in 2010 Bollywood film Housefull. The Calcutta High Court restrained producer Sajid Nadiadwala from the cinematic use of the song.

Trivia
 "Neele Neele Ambar Par", sung by Kishore Kumar was a copy of the original song "Ilaya Nila" song composed by Ilaiyaraaja

Collaboration with singers

Kishore Kumar:

The duo composed 270 songs for Kishore Kumar. Their superhit songs with Kishore Kumar included all-time hit "Zindagi ka safar" from Safar (1970), "O Saathi Re" from Muqaddar Ka Sikandar (1978), "mera jeevan kora kagaz" from Kora Kagaz (1974), Jeevan se bhari teri aankhe " from Safar (1970), "pal pal dil ke paas" from Blackmail (1974), "neele neele ambar
par " from Kalakaar (1985),  "samjhauta gamon se kar lo" from Samjhauta (1973), "Apne jeevan ki ulzan ko" from Uljhan (1975) and the chart buster qawwali "Qurbani Qurbani Qurbani" from Qurbani(1980).

Mohammed Rafi:

The duo composed many songs for Mohd Rafi. At their initial stage as music director, Mohd Rafi was their first choice of singer. They made
numerous popular song with him. All songs of Jab Jab Phool Khile were a huge hit and catapulted them to fame and there was no looking back after that. Besides Jab Jab Phool Khile, there were many popular song with Mohd Rafi from films like Qurbani (Kya Dekhte Ho), Bluff Master (Govinda Ala Re Ala), Raaz ( Akele Hain Chehle Aao), Sacha Jhutha (Yuhi Tum Mujhse Baat Karti Hoo), Maryada (Tum Bhi Aja Ke), Haat Ki Safai (Vadaa Karle Sajna), Gopi (Sukh Ki Hai Saab Sathie), Qatilon Ka Qatil ( Yeh To Allah Ko Khabar & Oh Mere Chorni), Geet (Aja Tujh Ko Pukare Mere Geet) & Bairaag (Sare Shaher Mein App Sa) to named a few of the popular song. In the film, Muqaddar Ka Sikandar where most song was playbacked by Kishore Kumar, they used Mohd Rafi to sing Kishore Kumar Rote Hua Ate Saab some lines on the sad version of the song. The collaboration of Kalyanji & Anandji with Mohd Rafi created everlasting songs in a very unique style.

Lata Mangeshkar:

The duo composed 326 songs for Lata Mangeshkar in their career-24 under the name Kalyanji Veerji Shah and 302 under the name Kalyanji–Anandji-, the 4th highest number songs composed by any composer for Lataji's career after Laxmikant-Pyarelal (712),Shankar–Jaikishan (453)and Rahul Dev Burman (331).Their association with the singer goes back to 1954, when Kalyanji played the famous 'been' tune in Lata Mangeshkar's numbers like 'Man Dole Mera Tan Dole' in the movie Nagin (1954). Lata's influence on their music in the initial years can be gauged from the fact that in their first musical score Samrat Chandragupt (1958),Lataji was the only female playback singer, having sung 8 out of 8 numbers in the movie. However, since 1979 they started using Lata mangeshkar's voice very sparingly, even though they kept on offering songs to other senior singers like Kishore Kumar and Asha Bhosle. Since 1980s Lata's voice could only be heard in their scores like Bombay 405 Miles (1980), Katilon Ke Kaatil (1981),Khoon Ka Rishtaa (1981),Log Kya Kahenge (1982), Raaj Mahal (1982),Vidhaata(1982),Yudh (1985),Pighalta Aasman (1985),Mangal Dada (1986),Kalyug Aur Ramayan (1987),Desh Drohi (1988),Galiyon Ka Baadshah (1989) and Ulfat Ki Nayee Manzilen (1994). Among these,Kalyug Aur Ramayan and Ulfat Ki Nayee Manzilen had been in the making since long, especially the second one which was in the making since 1966, its music having been released in 1968 itself.

Some of her evergreen songs include the immortal "Salaam-e-ishq Meri Jaan" from Muqaddar Ka Sikander (1978), "Jiska Mujhe Tha Intezaar" from Don (1978), "Kabhi Raat Din Hum Door The" from Aamne Saamne (1967), "Yeh Saman" from Jab Jab Phool Khile (1965), "Humare Siva  Tumhare Aur Kitne deewane" from Apradh (1972), Lata's national award-winning song "Roothe roothe piya" from Kora Kagaz (1974), "Main Pyaasa Tum saawan' from Faraar (1975), "Hum The Jinke Sahare" fromSafar (1970), "Ja Re Ja O Harjaee" from Kalicharan (1976), "Thoda Sa Thehro" from Victoria No. 203 (1973) etc.

Asha Bhosle:

The duo composed 297 songs for Asha as well. Their well known songs with Asha is led by all-time hit "Yeh Mera Dil" from Don (1978). It earned Asha's 7th and last Filmfare Award as best singer. It was copied by world's leading band Black Eyed Peas in 1990 and their song earned Grammy Award. BEP's song included another K-A Bhosle number, "Aye Naujawan". Their other hits with Asha includes "Kya Dekhte Ho" from Qurbani (1978) Aaiye aapka tha hamein intzar (Mahal-1969), Husn ke laakhon rang (Johny mera naam-1970) "O Saathi Re" from Muqaddar Ka Siqandar (1978)

Manna Dey:

The duo composed the great number "kasme vaade pyar wafa ke "  in Manna Dey's voice in "Upkar" ( 1968)   and the chart buster qawwali "Yari hai imman Mera"  from Zanjeer ( 1973)

Mukesh:

The duo composed many heart touching melodies in the voice of Mukesh like " chandsi mehboba ho meri aia maine socha tha ha tum bilkul wais ho jaisa maine socha tha ",  " hum chodel hai mehfil ko yaad aa ye kisi ko mat rona ",  "koi jab tumhara hriday tod de " , " kya khoob lagthi ho , badi sundar dikhthi ho ","jo tumko ho pasand wohi baat kahenge".etc.

Mahendra Kapoor

They also composed many memorable songs for Mahendra Kapoor, "Mere Desh Ki Dharti sona ugle ugle heere moti" in Upkaar, and the unique song "Ek tara bole to tum kya kahe"
"Twinkle Twinkle little star" in Purab Aur Pacham and "O Shanker mere" from Bairaag. Mahendra Kapoor has been the preferred playback singer of Kalyanji Anandji giving numerous hit songs.

Awards
Cine Music Directors Award – 1965 – Himalay Ki God Mein
First National Award – 1968 – Saraswatichandra
Filmfare Award – 1974 – Kora Kagaz
First Platinum Disc by HMV – Muqaddar Ka Sikandar (1978)
1st Platinum Disc by Polydor – Qurbani (1980)
IMPPA Award  – 1992 – For Contribution to Films
Padma Shri by the Government of India – For Outstanding Contribution
IIFA Award (South Africa) – 2003 – Lifetime Achievement Award
Sahara Parivar Award (United Kingdom) – 2004 – Lifetime Achievement Award
BMI Award (United States) – 2006 – For Grammy Award-winning rap song "Don't Phunk with My Heart"
GIMA (Great Indian Music Awards) - 2015 - Lifetime Achievement Award

Discography

Songs and films
Their songs repeatedly entered the top popularity ratings of Binaca Geetmala and topped the list many times. Some of their notable compositions, by song title, are as follows:

"Aankhon Aankhon Me Hum Tum" (Mahal, 1969)
"Aaj Kal Hum Se Roothe Huye Hain Sanam" (Aamne Saamne, 1967)
"Aaj Ki Raat Sajan" (Viswas, 1969)
"Aao Tumhe Me Pyar Sikha Doon" (Upasna, 1971)
"Aap Se Humko Bichhade Huye" (Vishwas, 1969)
"Akele Hai Chale Aao" (Raaz, 1967)
"Ankhiyon Ka Noor Hai Tu" (Johar Mehmood in Goa, 1965)
"Apni to jaise taise" (Laawaris, 1978)
"Are Diwano Mujhe Pehchano" (Don, 1978)
"Are Husn Chala Kuchh Aisi" (Bluffmaster, 1963)
"Are Oh Re, Dharti ki Tarah" (Suhaag Raat, 1968)
"Aur Iss Dil Mein Kya" (Imaandaar, 1987)
"Are Rafta Rafta Dekho Meri" (Kahani Kismat Ki, 1973)
"Badi Door Se Aaye hain" (Samjhauta, 1973)
"Ban Ke Sathi Pyar Ki Raho Mein" (Sweetheart, 1971)
"Bekhudi Mein Sanam" (Haseena Maan Jayegi, 1968)
"Bharat Ka Rahnewala Hoon" (Purab Aur Pachhim, 1970)
"Bina Badra ke Bijuria" (Bandhan, 1969)
"Bure Bhi Hum Bhale Bhi Hum" (Banarasi Babu, 1973)
"Chahe Aaj Mujhe Na Pasand Karo" (Darinda, 1977)
"Chahe Paas Ho" (Samrat Chandragupta, 1959)
"Chand Aahen Bharega" (Phool Bane Angaare, 1963)
"Chandan Sa Badan" (Saraswatichandra, 1968)
"Chand Si Mehbooba" (Himalay Ki God Mein, 1965)
"Chandi Ki Dewar Na Todi" (Viswas, 1969)
"Chale The Saath Milkar " (Haseena Maan Jayegi, 1968)
"Chhalia Mera Naam" (Chhalia, 1960)
"Chhuk Chhuk" (Rafoo Chakkar, 1975)
"Chhoti Si Umar Mein Lag" (Bairaag, 1976)
"Chupke Se Dil Dai De" (Maryada, 1971)
"Dam Dam Diga Diga" (Chhalia, 1960)
"Darpan Ko Dekha" (Upasna, 1971)
"Dheere Re Chalo Gori" (Johar Mahmood in Goa, 1965)
"Dil Beqarar Sa Hai" (Ishaara, 1964)
"Dil Jalon Ka Dil Jalake" (Zanjeer, 1973)
"Dil Ko Dekho Chehra Na Dekho" (Sachaa Jhutha, 1970)
"Dil Lootnewale Jadugaar" (Madari, 1959)
"Dil Ne Dil Se" (Rakhwala, 1971)
"Dil To Dil Hai" (Kab Kyon Aur Kahan, 1970)
"Dilwala Diwana Mutwala Mastana" (Professor Pyarelal, 1981)
"Do bechare bina sahare" (Victoriya No. 203, 1972)
"Do Qadam Tum Bhi Chalo" (Ek Hasina Do Diwane, 1971)
"Dulhan Chali" (Purab Aur Pachhim, 1970)
"Duniya Mein Pyar Ki Sab Ko" (Sachaa Jhutha, 1970)
"Duniya Mujhe Se Kahti Hai Ki Peena Chod De" (Kahani Kismat Ki, 1973) 
"Ek Baat Poochu Dil Ki Baat" (Kathputli, 1971)
"Ek Se Badhkar Ek" (Ek Se Badhkar Ek, 1976)
"Ek Tara Bole" (Yaadgaar, 1970)
"Ek Tha Gul Aur Ek Thi" (Jab Jab Phool Khile, 1965)
"Ek Tuna Mila", (Himalay Ki God Mein, 1965)
"Ga Ga Ga Gaye Ja" (Professor Pyarelal, 1981)
"Gali Gali Mein" (Tridev, 1989) kfg
"Ganga Maiya Men Jab Tak" (Suhaag Raat, 1968)
"Gazar Ne Kiya Hai Ishara (Tridev, 1989) Azhar (film)
"Ghodi Pe Ho Ke Sawar" (Ghulam Begam Badshah, 1973)
"Govinda Aala Re Aala" (Bluff Master, 1963)
"Guni Jano Bhakt Jano" (Anshoo Aur Muskan, 1970)
"Har Kisiko Nahi Milta" (Jaanbaaz, 1986)
"He Re Kanhaiya" (Chhoti Bahu, 1971)
"Hum Bolega To Bologe Ki" (Kasauti, 1974)
"Hum Chod Chale Hai Mehfil Ko" (Ji Chahta Hai, 1964)
"Humare Siva Tumhare Aur Kitne Diwane" (Apradh, 1972)
"Hum Ko Mohabbat Ho Gai Hai" (Haath Ki Safai, 1974)
"Hum The Jinke Sahare" (Safar, 1970)
"Humsafar Ab Yeh Safar Ka" (Juari, 1968)
"Humsafar Mere Humsafar" (Purnima, 1965)
"Hamne Tujhko Pyar Kiya Hai " (Dulha Dulhan, 1964)
"Humne Aaj Se Tume Yeh Naam De Diya" (Raja Sahab, 1969)
"Ho Gaye Hum Aapke Kasamse" (Bombay 405 Miles, 1981)
"Husna ke Lakhon rang"(Johny Mera Naam, 1970)
"Ja Re Ja O Harjaee" (Kalicharan, 1976)
"Jeevan Se Bhari Teri Aankhen" (Safar, 1970)
"Jiske Sapne Humen Roz Aate Hai (Geet, 1971)
"Jis Dil Mein Basa Tha Pyar Tera" (Saheli, 1965)
"Jis Path Pe Chala" (Yaadgaar, 1970)
"Jo Pyar Tune Mujhko Diya Tha" (Dulha Dulhan, 1964)
"Jo Tumko Ho Pasand Wahi Baat Karenge" (Safar, 1970)
"Jo Tum Hansoge To" (Kathputli, 1971)
"Jubaan Pe Dardbharee Daastaan" (Maryada, 1971)
"Kankaria Maar Ke Jagaya" (Himalay Ki God Mein, 1965)
"Kabhi Raat Din Hum Door The" (Aamne Samne, 1978)
"Karle Pyar Karle Aankhen Char" (Sacha Jhoota, 1970)
"Kasam Na Lo koyee Humse" (Bombay 405 Miles, 1981)
"Kaun Raha Hai Kaun Rahega" (Sankoch, 1976)
"Khaike Paan Banaraswala" (Don, 1978)
"Khai Thi Kasam" (Dil Ne Pukara, 1967)
"Khush Raho Har Khushi He" (Suhaag Raat, 1968)
"Kisi Rah Mein Kisi Mod Par" (Mere Humsafar, 1970)
"Koi Jab Tumhara Hriday Tod De" (Purab Aur Paschim, 1970)
"Koi Koi Aadmi Diwana Hota Hai" (Sweetheart, 1971)
"Koi Koi Raat Aisi Hoti Hai" (Banarasi Babu, 1973)
"Kub Ke Bichhade hue" (Lawaaris, 1981)
"Kya Hua Kya Nahin" (Yudh, 1985)
"Kya Khoob Lagti Ho" (Dharmatma, 1975)
"Laila O Laila" (Qurbani, 1980)
"Le Chal Mere Jivan Sathi" (Vishwas, 1969)
"Luk Chhip Luk Chhip Jaona" (Do Anjane,1976)
"Main To Ek Khwab Hoon" (Himalay Ki God Mein, 1965)
"Main Bairagi Nachoon Gaoon" (Bairaag, 1976)
"Main Doob Jatah Hoon" (Black Mail, 1973)
"Main Pyasa Tum Sawan" (Faraar, 1975)
"Main Teri Mohabatt Mein" (Tridev, 1989)
"Main To Bhool Chali Babul Ka Desh" (Saraswatichandra, 1968)
"Main Tujhe Milne Aayee Mandir" (Heera, 1973)
"Mere Desh Ki Dharti" (Upkar, 1967)
"Mere Dil Ne Jo Maanga" (Rakhwala, 1971)
"Mera Jeevan Kora Kagaz" (Kora Kagaz, 1973) – this soundtrack won a Filmfare Award and topped in Binaca Geetmala for the year 1974.
"Meri Lotery Lag" (Holi Aayi Re, 1970)
"Mere Mitwa Mere Meet Re" (Geet, 1970)
"Mere Toote Hue Dil Se" (Chhalia, 1960)
"Meri Jaan Kuch Bhi Keejiye" (Chhalia, 1960)
"Meri Pyari Behaniya" (Sacha Jhoota, 1970)
"Mile Mile Do Badan" (Black Mail, 1973)
"Mujhe Kahte Hai Kallu Qawal" (Dulha Dulhan, 1964)
"Mujhko Is Raat Ki Tanhai Mein Awaz Na do" (Dil Bhi Tera Hum Bhi Tere, 1960)
"My Guru" (Thicker Than Water, 2003)
"Na Na Karte Pyar Tumhin Se" (Jab Jab Phool Khile, 1965)
"Nafarat Karne Walon Ke" (Johny Mera Naam, 1970)
"Na Koi Raha Hai Na Koi Rahega" (Johar Mehmood in Goa, 1965)
"Naino Mein Nindiya Hai" (Joroo Ka Ghulam, 1972)
"Nazar Ka Jhuk Jana" (Passport, 1961)
"O Dilbar Jaaniye" (Haseena Maan Jayegi, 1968)
"O Mere Raja" (Johny Mera Naam, 1970)
"O Sathi Re Tere Bina bhi" (Muqaddar Ka Sikander, 1978)
"O Tumse Door Rehke" (Adalat, 1976)
"Pal Pal Dil Ke Paas" (Black Mail, 1973)
"Pal bhar ke liye" (Johny Mera Naam, 1970)
"Pardesiyon Se aakhiyan milana" (Jab Jab Phool Khile, 1965)
"Peene Walo Ko Peene Ka Bahana" (Haath Ki Safai, 1974)
"Peete Peete Kabhi Kabhi" (Bairaag, 1976)
"Phool Tumhe Bheja Hai Khat Main" (Saraswatichandra, 1968)
"priye Praneshwari" (Hum Tum Aur Woh, 1971)
"pyar to ek din hona thaa" (Ek Shrimaan Ek Shrimati, 1969)
"Pyar Se Dil Bhar De" (Kab Kyoun Aur Kahaan, 1970)
"Qasme Wade Pyar Wafa" (Upkar, 1967)
"Rafta Rafta Dekho Meri" (Kahani Kismat Ki, 1973)
"Rahne Do Rahne Do, Gile Shikwe" (Rakhwala, 1971)
"Saaz-E-Dil Chhed De" (Passport, 1961)
"Sabke Rahte Lagta Hai Jaise" (Samjhauta, 1973)
"Samjhauta Gamon Se Karlo"(Samjhauta, 1973)
"Salaam-e-ishq Meri Jaan" (Muqaddar Ka Sikander 1978)
"Sama he suhana suhana"(Ghar Ghar Ki Kahani, 1970)
"Sukh Ke Sab Saathi" (Gopi, 1970)
"Tera Saath Kitna Pyara" (Jaanbaaz, 1986)
"Tere Chehre Mein Woh" (Dharmatma, 1975)
"Tere Hoton Ke do phool" (Paras, 1971)
"Tere Naina Kyon Bhar Aaye" (Geet, 1971)
"Teri raho me khade hai dil tham ke" (Chhalia, 1960)
"Teri Zulfein Pareshan" (Preet Na Jane Reet, 1963)
"Thoda Sa Thehro" (Victoria No. 203,1973)
"Tirchi Topiwale" (Tridev, 1989)
"Tum Ko Mere Dil Ne Pukara" (Rafoo Chakkar, 1975)
"Tum Mile Pyar Se"(Apradh, 1972)
"Tum Se Door Reh Ke" (Adalat, 1976)
"Tu Kya Jane" (Haadsaa, 1983)
"Tu Kya Jane Wafaa O Bewafa" (Haath Ki Safai, 1974)
"Tu Na Mili To Hum Jogi Baan Jayenge" (Victoria No. 203, 1972)
"Tu yaar Hai Mera" (Kahani Kismat Ki, 1973)
"Vaada Kar Le Sajna" (Haath Ki Safai, 1974)
"Waqt Karta Jo Wafa" (Dil Ne Pukara, 1967)
"Yaari Hai Meri Imaan" (Zanjeer, 1973)
"Yeh Bombay Saher Hai Haadsaa" (Haadsaa, 1983)
"Yeh Duniyawale Poochhenge" (Mahal), 1969)
"Yeh Mera Dil" (Don, 1978)
"Yeh Raat Hai Pyasi Pyasi" (Chhoti Bahu, 1971)
"Yeh Sama, Sama hai yeh pyar Ka" (Jab Jab Phool Khile, 1965)
"Y.O.G.A Karo Yoga Yoga" (Haadsaa, 1983)
"Ye Do Diwane Dilke, Chale" (Johar Mehmood in Goa, 1965)
"Ye Vada Raha" (Professor Pyarelal,1981)
"Yunhi Tum Mujhse Baat Karti Ho" (Sachaa Jhutha, 1970)
"Yudh Kar" (Yudh, 1985)
"Zindagi Ka Safar Hai Ye Kaisa Safar" (Safar, 1970)
"Zuban Pe Dard Bhari Dastan" (Maryada, 1971)

Associations

Prakash Mehra
Haseena Maan Jayegi
Zanjeer
Haath Ki Safai
Hera Pheri
Muqaddar Ka Sikandar
Lawaaris
Ghungroo
Imaandaar
Jaadugar

Manoj Kumar
Upkar
Purab Aur Paschim

Feroz Khan
Apradh
Dharmatma
Qurbani
Janbaaz

Manmohan Desai
Chhaliya
Bluff Master
Sachcha Jhutha

Sultan Ahmed
Heera
Ganga Ki Saugandh
Daata

Rajiv Rai
Yudh
Tridev

Gulshan Rai
Vidhaata
Johny Mera Naam

Subhash Ghai
Kalicharan
Vidhaata

References

External links
Kalyanji Anandji  Kalyanji Anandji's Association with Mohammed Rafi
Lyrics of Hindi Movie Songs composed by Kalyanji Anandji
Kalyanji-Anandji's Filmography (over 250 movies)
List of Hindi songs from Kalyanji-Anandji (over 500 songs)

Filmfare Awards winners
Gujarati people
Indian musical duos
Sibling musical duos
Living people
Hindi film score composers
Best Music Direction National Film Award winners
Year of birth missing (living people)